The men's 3000 metres steeplechase event at the 1999 Summer Universiade was held at the Estadio Son Moix in Palma de Mallorca, Spain on 9–11 July.

Medalists

Results

Heats

Final

References

Athletics at the 1999 Summer Universiade
1999